Mack Willie Herron (July 24, 1948 – December 6, 2015) was a professional American football running back who played in the National Football League from 1973 to 1976. He played college football at Kansas State, where he finished second in the nation in scoring during his senior season in 1969.

History

In 1972, while playing for the Winnipeg Blue Bombers, he won the Eddie James Memorial Trophy for being the leading rusher in the CFL's West Division. He led the league in all-purpose yards in both of his CFL seasons.  The Blue Bombers released him as a result of a drug arrest in May 1972.

Herron moved to the NFL in 1973, when he joined the New England Patriots. He later played for the Atlanta Falcons. In three seasons, he gained 1,298 rushing yards and scored 9 rushing touchdowns. He also caught 61 passes in his career for 789 yards and 6 touchdowns.

After leading the NFL in kickoff returns and kickoff return yardage in 1973, Herron's best season was 1974 with the Patriots, when he set the then-NFL record for all-purpose yards with 2,444.  The Patriots released him midway through the following season, with coach Chuck Fairbanks claiming the release was the result of disappointment with Herron's performance that season and with a late night party Herron threw for teammate Leon Gray.  He was then signed by the Falcons. He remains 16th all time in career punt return average and 86th in kickoff return average. In 2009, he was named by the Patriots Hall of Fame nomination committee to the Patriots All-Decade Team for the 1970s as a kick returner.

Herron, a devout Muslim who did not drink or smoke, was arrested some 20 times and served jail time, mainly on drug convictions, according to Chicago Police. He died on December 6, 2015, at the age of 67.

References

1948 births
2015 deaths
American football running backs
Canadian football running backs
Atlanta Falcons players
Farragut Career Academy alumni
Hutchinson Blue Dragons football players
Kansas State Wildcats football players
New England Patriots players
Winnipeg Blue Bombers players
Sportspeople from Biloxi, Mississippi
Players of American football from Mississippi
African-American players of American football
African-American players of Canadian football
African-American Muslims
20th-century African-American sportspeople
21st-century African-American people